Fred Halsey Kraege (1899–1982) was Mayor of Madison, Wisconsin. He held the office from 1943 to 1947.

References

Mayors of Madison, Wisconsin
1899 births
1982 deaths
20th-century American politicians